Mowll is a surname. Notable people with the surname include:

 Edward Mowll (1881–1964), English Anglican bishop
 Howard Mowll (1890–1958), Australian Anglican Archbishop of Sydney 
 Joshua Mowll (born 1970), British children’s author

See also
 Moll (surname)